Leaders of states in the U.S. which have significant mineral deposits often create a state mineral, rock, stone or gemstone to promote interest in their natural resources, history, tourism, etc. Not every state has an official state mineral, rock, stone and/or gemstone, however.

In the chart below, a year which is listed within parentheses represents the year during which that mineral, rock, stone or gemstone was officially adopted as a state symbol or emblem.

Table of minerals, rocks, stones and gemstones

See also
 Lists of U.S. state insignia
 List of U.S. state fossils

Endnotes

References

External links

Minerals
U.S. state minerals, rocks, stones and gemstones
U.S. state symbols
U.S. state symbols
.U.S. state symbols